Bill Buckbee is a Republican member of the Connecticut House of Representatives serving in Connecticut's 67th district.

References

External links 
 Official website

Living people
21st-century American politicians
Republican Party members of the Connecticut House of Representatives
Western Connecticut State University alumni
Year of birth missing (living people)